The 2007 Campeonato Paulista|Campeonato Paulista de Futebol Profissional da Primeira Divisão - Série A1 was the 106th edition of São Paulo's top professional football league. The competition began on 17 January and ended on 22 April, with the finals, and was held at the Morumbi in São Paulo. Santos successfully defended its 16th titile to add to its cache the 2007 Cam 17th title and 2nd consecutive after a 2–2 aggregate score in the finals against São Caetano. As Santos had the best campaign in the first phase, they were crowned champions.
This season marked the return of the Campeonato do Interior (Interior Championship), where the clubs from the countryside of the state of São Paulo that did not qualify to the knockout phase would contest among themselves to determine the champion club from the countryside.

First phase

League table

Results

Knockout phase

Bracket

Semi-finals

Finals

Campeonato do Interior

Bracket

Semi-finals

Finals

Top scorers

Source:

See also
 Copa Paulista de Futebol
 Campeonato Paulista Série A2
 Campeonato Paulista Série A3
 Campeonato Paulista Segunda Divisão

References

External links
 Federação Paulista de Futebol 

Campeonato Paulista seasons
Paulista